Glenn Wrage is an American actor and model, who has performed numerous roles in television, film, and video games.

Career
His film credits include Saving Private Ryan, Razor Blade Smile, The First 9 1/2 Days, Thunderpants and Octane.

He is also known for the prominent voices of Cranky and Spencer in the US version of the British children's series Thomas & Friends from 2009 to 2021.

Outside of acting, Wrage also works as a model.

Filmography

Film

Television

Video games

References

External links

Living people
American male film actors
American male television actors
American male video game actors
American male voice actors
20th-century American male actors
21st-century American male actors
Year of birth missing (living people)
Place of birth missing (living people)